The School of Graduate Studies (SPS) nurtures, promotes and advances outstanding achievement in graduate education at Universiti Teknologi Malaysia (UTM). It monitors and ensures the quality and integrity of graduate programmes through continual review by internal and external auditors.

Feedback from audit reports are capitalised for improvements and currency of programmes. The entails that students are provided with academic training of the highest standard in research and other scholarly activities.

SPS is located at the F54 building in UTM Johor Bahru and its Kuala Lumpur branch is at the UTM Kuala Lumpur Campus.

History

Postgraduate studies have been offered in UTM since 1982 shortly after the National Technical Institute (ITK) was upgraded to UTM in 1975. The School of Graduate Studies (SPS) UTM Johor Bahru, Malaysia was established soon after UTM was given the approval by the Malaysian Ministry of Education on October 15, 1992.

On March 2, 1993 the senate agreed to change the name of SPS to Centre of Graduate Studies (PPS) due to technical issues to ensure it is in line with the UTM Constitution (Akta Universiti dan Kolej Universiti 1971, Perintah (Pengecualian) Universiti Teknologi Malaysia, 1976). However the name SPS was reintroduced on January 1, 2000 as it is in line with the University and College Act 1971 – Universiti Teknologi Malaysia Constitution (1998).

Administration
Under the administration of a dean, four deputy deans, a director, four academic managers, an IT manager, a deputy registrar and 65 non-academic staff, SPS has developed from its humble beginning by offering postgraduate courses to local students to catering thousands of local and international students from all around the globe.

Role

SPS provides services ranging from promotion, application, registration, consultation and continuous guidance to Postgraduate students. It is well equipped with skilled academic and non-academic staff to cater to all the need of the students to ensure a comfortable and smooth environment during their tenure here.

With other units in UTM such as Students Affairs Office, SPS thrives in providing the best services and is sensitive to issues concerning Postgraduate students.

The promotion efforts did locally and internationally have bore fruit now that UTM is one of the universities with the highest number of postgraduate Students. New international students will be provided with residential colleges once they register in UTM and they have to pass certain health and English requirements.

External links

University of Technology Malaysia
Technical universities and colleges in Malaysia
1982 establishments in Malaysia